Alonso Muñoz de Gadea (1630s-1708) was a Spanish politician, accountant and military officer who served in Buenos Aires during the Viceroyalty of Peru as Alcalde, Procurador and Mayordomo of the Cathedral Mayor of the city.

Biography 

He was born in Lima (Viceroyalty of Peru), the son of Juan de Gadea and Josefa Muñoz, belonging to a family of Spanish Creole origin. He studied in Lima, and settled in Buenos Aires around 1650, where he married Francisca Cabral de Ayala, daughter of Juan Cabral de Melo y Alpoin and Inés Leal de Ayala, belonging to a noble family of Buenos Aires.

He was elected alcalde of 2nd vote of Buenos Aires in 1671, and served procurator of the city in 1673, and appointed to the post of Mayordomo of the Church of Buenos Aires in 1690. He also had an active participation in the Provincial Militias of Buenos Aires and Santiago,  where he served as commander of the military detachments of those cities.

Family 
 
Alonso Muñoz de Gadea and his wife had two adoptive daughters, Inés Muñoz de Gadea Ayala, who was married to Capt. Tomás de Quiñones, and Agueda de Gadea, wife of Bernardino Ramírez de Céspedes, an alférez, born in the city, son of Juan Ramírez, born in Málaga and Josefa de Rivera, daughter of Andrés Jorge de Bohórquez and Francisca de Rivera.

His wife was a maternal granddaughter of Mateo Leal de Ayala, a distinguished Spanish politician who served as Governor and Mayor of Buenos Aires.

References

External links 
Documentos y planos relativos al periodo edilicio colonial de la ciudad de Buenos-Aires - archive.org
Matrimonios 1656-1762

1630s births
1708 deaths
Spanish colonial governors and administrators
People from Buenos Aires
People from Lima
Mayors of Buenos Aires